Trechus artemisiae is a species of ground beetle in the subfamily Trechinae. It was described by Jules Putzeys in 1872.

References

artemisiae
Beetles described in 1872